The  is a wireless adapter accessory for the Game Boy Advance, released by Nintendo in 2004. It provides an alternative to the Game Boy Advance Game Link Cable but is only supported by a small number of games.  The Game Boy Advance Wireless Adapter is also compatible with the Game Boy Advance SP, Game Boy Player, and e-Reader.

Connectivity

Like the Game Boy Advance Game Link Cable, this device allows for multiplayer gaming with the Game Boy Advance, and attaches via the External Extension Connector.  The range of this adapter is short compared to the built-in wireless function of the Nintendo DS; Nintendo recommends players stay within 10 ft. (about 3m) of each other for best results. Due to the Game Boy Micro's different style link cable port, the Game Boy Advance Wireless Adapter will not attach to it. However, a Game Boy Micro Wireless Adapter is available for the Game Boy Micro which is compatible for linking with the Game Boy Advance Wireless Adapter.  Neither wireless adapter can connect with the Nintendo DS since the DS does not support multiplayer mode in Game Boy Advance games.

One of the wireless adapter's greatest uses is in Pokémon FireRed, LeafGreen, and Emerald.  While all three still support the Game Boy Advance Game Link Cable (and must use a link cable to link with Ruby and Sapphire), up to thirty-nine wireless adapter-connected players can convene in a virtual in-game lobby called the "Union Room" for battles and trades. The wireless adapter is also used in Pokémon games to download special data via the Mystery Gift option at various Pokémon-related events.  Besides the Union Room in certain Pokémon versions, the wireless adapter only supports up to five players.

A major drawback of the Game Boy Advance Wireless Adapter is that it is not backwards compatible; that is, it will only work with games that have been programmed to support the wireless adapter, excluding all older model Game Boy games.  As of July 2009, only about 30 Game Boy Advance games support the wireless adapter, and many of the few supported games are the bit Generations series (Japan only) and the Classic NES Series.

Search feature
This feature can be accessed when the system was turned on with only the wireless adapter inserted but no game cartridge is present. It's also possible to boot the wireless adapter, or any single-pak multiplayer, with a game inserted by holding Start and Select as the system boots up. It will continually search for compatible games that are being played nearby.  This allows players to easily see who is hosting a game that can be joined.

Marketing and pricing
The accessory was packaged with most Pokémon FireRed and Pokémon LeafGreen games and was also available for separate sale.  Nintendo of America sells the device separately on its online store.

Compatible games
With the wireless adapter launching somewhat later into the Game Boy Advance lifecycle, there are very few games that support it. Compatible games are identified by an icon labeled Wireless Adapter Compatible. Mario Golf: Advance Tour and the multiplayer NES Classics are missing this label, even if they are compatible.

List

bit Generations series (Japan only)
Boktai 2: Solar Boy Django
Boktai 3: Sabata's Counterattack (Japan only)
Classic NES Series:
Clu Clu Land (Japan only)
Donkey Kong (arcade game)
Dr. Mario
Ice Climber 
Pac-Man
Super Mario Bros.
Xevious
Digimon Racing (Wireless Adapter functionality is also available in the European release)
Dragon Ball Z: Buu's Fury
Hamtaro: Ham-Ham Games
Keroro Gunsou Taiketsu! Keroro Cart de Arimasu!! (Japan only)
The Lord of the Rings: The Third Age
Mario Golf: Advance Tour
Mario Tennis: Power Tour
Mega Man Battle Network 5 Team Colonel
Mega Man Battle Network 5 Team ProtoMan
Mega Man Battle Network 6: Cybeast Falzar
Mega Man Battle Network 6: Cybeast Gregar
Momotaro Dentetsu G: Make a Gold Deck! (Japan only)
Nonono Puzzle Chalien (Japan only)
Pokémon Emerald
Pokémon FireRed
Pokémon LeafGreen
Sennen Kazoku (Japan only)
Shrek SuperSlam

Notes

References

Game Boy accessories